Mait may refer to:
 Mait (given name), an Estonian name
 Maydh, a town in Somalia

MAIT may refer to:
 Maharaja Agrasen Institute of Technology, in New Delhi, India
 Mucosal associated invariant T cells, a T cell type
 Martial Arts Instructor-Trainers, a unit belonging to the Marine Corps Martial Arts Program
 Multidisciplinary Accident Investigation Teams of the California Highway Patrol

See also 
 Meit (disambiguation)